Marco Storari (born 7 January 1977) is an Italian former footballer who played as a goalkeeper.

After a lengthy spell in Italy's lower leagues, he arrived in Serie A aged 27. Steady performances for Messina prompted his signing by A.C. Milan in 2007; during his time at the Milanese club, Storari had loan spells with several other Italian sides, as well as Spanish club Levante. He later joined Juventus in 2010, where he mainly served as a back-up to Gianluigi Buffon, winning four consecutive Serie A titles with the club as well as the Coppa Italia. He later returned to Cagliari, where he spent a season and a half, helping the team win the 2015–16 Serie B title and earn promotion to Serie A. He returned to Milan in January 2017, where he spent another season and a half as the club's reserve goalkeeper before retiring in the summer of 2018.

Club career

Early years / Messina

Born in Pisa, Storari finished his football formation at Perugia Calcio and Montevarchi Calcio Aquila 1902 (six months), making his professional debuts with A.C. Ancona, in the third division. With the latter, he helped to promotion to Serie B in 2000.

After two seasons, Storari left for S.S.C. Napoli which was also then in the second level, in a joint-ownership deal. He continued to play in that category subsequently, joining F.C. Messina Peloro on loan in January 2002 in exchange for Emanuele Manitta, with the deal being made permanent in summer 2003; Messina promoted at the end of the 2003–04 campaign, with him as an undisputed starter.

Storari made his Serie A debut on 12 September 2004 in a 0–0 away draw against Parma FC, as the newcomer club went on to finish in seventh place. In the following seasons he remained the starter, as Messina nearly relegated in 2005–06 after only being reinstated after the outcome of the 2006 Italian football scandal, but eventually dropping down a level the following year, as last.

Milan
On 17 January 2007, Storari was acquired by A.C. Milan for €1.2 million, signing a -year contract as an emergency signing as both Dida and backup Željko Kalac were out of action due to injury. In three league appearances, against A.S. Livorno Calcio, A.C. Siena and Udinese Calcio, he conceded seven goals.

On 3 July 2007, reports surfaced that Milan were close to sending Storari to La Liga side Real Betis, on a one-year loan. The deal was increased to two years and the player, along with his manager, traveled to Seville. Although having stayed in the city for three days, Betis president Manuel Ruiz de Lopera failed to meet with the player and Storari returned to Italy as the transfer failed to materialize; on 12 August he was eventually loaned to another club in Spain, Levante UD, on a two-year contract.

However, the loan deal ended after only six months, as the Valencian team was immerse in a deep financial crisis; on 5 January 2008 Storari returned to Italy, with Cagliari Calcio due to Levante's inability to pay his salary. "[The] club was in financial difficulty and couldn’t pay me...there are some wonderful people here who were honest with us, but working without pay is a difficult situation to be in".

Storari signed a loan contract for ACF Fiorentina in July 2008. His output consisted of a Coppa Italia match and another in the league, barred by longtime first-choice Sébastien Frey.

Due to injury to starter Christian Abbiati, Storari began 2009–10 as first-choice, over Dida. On 22 August 2009, two years and three months after his last official match for the club, he was between the posts for the 2–1 win at Siena; additionally, in October, he signed a new contract, adding two extra years to his link, but suffered an injury afterwards, losing his place to the Brazilian.

After the recovery of Abbiati, Storari faced additional competition for a regular starting berth. Thus, on 15 January 2010, he went on loan to U.C. Sampdoria, replacing injured Luca Castellazzi; he played his first game two days later, in a 1–1 home draw against Calcio Catania.

Juventus
After Sampdoria failed to agree a deal with Milan to sign him outright, after losing Castellazzi to Inter Milan on a free transfer, Storari was sold to Juventus F.C. from Milan for a fee of €4.5 million on 23 June 2010, becoming the second signing of head coach Luigi Delneri and sports director Giuseppe Marotta, with whom he already had worked at Sampdoria. He signed a three-year contract effective on 1 July, providing cover for Gianluigi Buffon who sustained a back injury at the 2010 FIFA World Cup, and competed for a starting spot with Alex Manninger; Milan signed Marco Amelia on loan from Genoa C.F.C. on the same day, to act as his replacement.

After the recovery of Buffon, Storari became second-choice again. Despite the backup role he did not leave the Vecchia Signora in the summer of 2011 to play more often, and instead extended his contract until 30 June 2014 in November.

On 16 May 2015, as Juventus had already been crowned league champions for the fourth straight time, Storari started against Inter in order to rest Buffon for the 2015 UEFA Champions League Final. In the last five minutes of play, he made a double save on Rodrigo Palacio first and then Mauro Icardi to keep his team's 2–1 lead and secure the away win. Additionally, he appeared in five matches in the Italian Cup, including the 2–1 final win over S.S. Lazio.

Return to Cagliari
On 3 July 2015, Storari signed with Cagliari on a two-year contract, returning to the club after a seven-year absence. In his first season in his second spell he only missed one league in 42, helping to obtain top flight promotion after one year.

Return to Milan
On 10 January 2017, 40-year-old Storari re-joined his former team Milan on an initial six-month deal. In June, he extended his contract until the end of 2017–18 season. After his contract with the club expired at the end of the season, Storari became a free agent in the summer of 2018, after which he subsequently retired from professional football.

International career
Storari was never capped for Italy, although he was selected as third-choice by national boss Marcello Lippi for a 2006 FIFA World Cup qualifier against Slovenia in October 2005.

Style of play
Storari was known to be an extremely reliable goalkeeper and a consistent shot-stopper, who was gifted with good reactions and who inspired a sense of confidence in his back-line; he was also adept at stopping penalties.

Personal life
Storari and his wife Veronica had two sons, Tommaso (b. 2010) and Piergiorgo (2011).

Club statistics

Honours
Juventus
Serie A: 2011–12, 2012–13, 2013–14, 2014–15
Supercoppa Italiana: 2012, 2013; Runner-up 2014
Coppa Italia: 2014–15; Runner-up 2011–12
UEFA Champions League: Runner-up 2014–15

Cagliari
Serie B: 2015–16

References

External links

 

1977 births
Living people
Sportspeople from Pisa
Italian footballers
Association football goalkeepers
Serie A players
Serie B players
Serie C players
A.C. Perugia Calcio players
A.C. Ancona players
S.S.C. Napoli players
A.C.R. Messina players
A.C. Milan players
Cagliari Calcio players
ACF Fiorentina players
U.C. Sampdoria players
Juventus F.C. players
La Liga players
Levante UD footballers
Italian expatriate footballers
Expatriate footballers in Spain
UEFA Champions League winning players
Footballers from Tuscany